Qurayyat Salim  is a town in the Amman Governorate of north-western Jordan.

Climate
In Qurayyat Salim, there is a local steppe climate. Most rain falls in the winter. The Köppen-Geiger climate classification is BSk. About  of precipitation falls annually.

References

Populated places in Amman Governorate